In physical fitness, body composition is used to describe the percentages of fat, bone, water, and muscle in human bodies. Because muscular tissue takes up less space in the body than fat tissue, body composition, as well as weight, determines leanness. Two people of the same gender, height, and body weight may have completely different body types as a consequence of having different body compositions.

Body density
The most accurate estimation of body composition is derived from body density by means of the equation of fractional densities which states that the overall density of a mixture containing more than one substance (each with a different density) can be calculated if the proportion and density  of each component substance is known.  For determination of body composition the body is often assumed to be composed of four basic substances ("four compartment model") with the general form of the equation as follows:

 
Where:  = overall body density,  = proportion of water,  = proportion of fat,  = proportion of protein,  = proportion of mineral,  = density of water,  = density of fat,  = density of protein,  = density of mineral

In a research laboratory setting, the overall density of the body (Db) is calculated from its mass and volume (Db = mass/volume). The mass of the body is found by simply weighing a person on a scale.  The volume of the body is most easily and accurately determined by completely immersing a person in water and calculating the volume of water from the weight of water that is displaced (via "underwater weighing").  The proportions of water, protein and mineral in the body are found by various chemical and radiometric tests.  The densities of water, fat, protein, and mineral are either measured or estimated.  The equation is then rearranged to solve for the proportion of fat (f) from the other quantities.

A reasonably accurate estimation of body fat can be obtained by means of a "two compartment model" of the human body which is based upon two simplifying assumptions:  1. Human fat has a density of 0.9 grams/ml, and 2. The lean (non-fat) components of the human body have an overall density of 1.1 grams/ml.

The two compartment model allows for an estimation of the proportions of fat and lean components of the body to be made from the overall body density.  And, as explained above, the overall body density (Db) is easily calculated from body mass and body volume. Rearranging the equation of fractional densities to solve for the proportion of fat (f) will yield the following equation:

The density of human fat is remarkably constant across all sub-groups studied but variations have been reported in the density of the fat free mass (i.e. lean or non-fat components).  To address these differences, unique equations for the two compartment model have been proposed for specific populations.

DEXA
Body composition measurement with dual energy X-ray absorptiometry (DEXA) is used increasingly for a variety of clinical and research applications. A DEXA scan requires medical supervision by a radiologist and some consider it to be the new "Gold Standard" in body composition testing. Total body scans using DEXA give accurate and precise measurements of body composition, including bone mineral content (BMC), bone mineral density (BMD), lean tissue mass, fat tissue mass, and fractional contribution of fat.

The estimation of body fatness from body density (using underwater weighing) was accepted as the "gold standard" for many decades. However, some researchers now claim that whole-body scanning techniques (e.g., "DEXA") are the new "gold standard."  But these claims are somewhat dubious since the scanning algorithms are validated against body composition assessments based on fractional density from underwater weighing.

DEXA measurements are highly reproducible if the same type of machine is used, making them excellent for monitoring pharmaceutical therapy, nutritional or exercise intervention, sports training, and other body composition altering programs. They are also fast, simple, non-invasive, and expose the subject to a level of x-rays less than that of a cross-country flight. DEXA exams provide both total body and up to 14 regional (trunk, individual arms & legs, android, gynoid, etc.) results.  However, the role of DEXA in clinical evaluations and research studies has been questioned by Wang et al. who stated that "the errors of the DXA [DEXA] method are still of concern if it were to be used as the criterion."

Air displacement plethysmography

Another technique for measuring body composition has been developed for measuring body volume using a different method than underwater weighing.  The technique uses air as opposed to water and is known as air displacement plethysmography (ADP).  Subjects enter a sealed chamber that measures their body volume through the displacement of air in the chamber. Next, body volume is combined with body weight (mass) to determine body density.  The technique then estimates the percentage of body fat and lean body mass (LBM) through empirically derived equations similar to those used with underwater weighing (for the density of fat and fat-free mass).

BIA 
Another method is bioelectrical impedance analysis  (BIA), which uses the resistance of electrical flow through the body to estimate body fat.  Unfortunately, BIA is highly sensitive to hydration status and water intake.  Drinking water dilutes the electrolytes in the body making it less conductive as does increasing body fat. 

InBody developed the world's first 8-point tactile electrode system in 1996, a direct segmental analysis method that measures the impedance of five torsos using multiple frequencies. Many BIA products provide partial muscle and fat mass measurements, but not impedance, especially in the torso.

Recent advancements such as 8-point electrodes, multi-frequency measurements, and Direct Segmental Analysis, have improved the accuracy of BIA machines. BIA machines have found acceptance in medical, fitness, and wellness space owing to their ease-of-use, portability, quick measurements, and cost efficiency.

Body Volume Index 

The Body Volume Index (BVI) is a technique used for measuring body shape. Initially, BVI technology employed white light scanning machines to measure an individuals body shape. However, recent technological advances in 3D measurement have enabled BVI to be calculated using images taken on a smartphone.  Two images are required to create an individual 3D silhouette. By comparing this 3D silhouette with MRI data, body volume and fat distribution can be calculated.

Skin folds
Body composition can also be measured using the skin fold test, which is performed using a measuring caliper. It can be done in nine steps: 
 Take measurements on the right side of the body.
 Mark client up.
 Pinch skin (KM) above mark
 Pull fat away from muscles
 Place caliper halfway between top and bottom of mark
 Allow caliper to settle (1–2 seconds)
 Take reading – repeat 15 seconds
 Add up total (4) – average
 Calculate body fat %

A common skin fold method is by using gun style calipers to measure the thickness of subcutaneous fat in multiple places on the body. This includes the abdominal area, the subscapular region, arms, buttocks and thighs. These measurements are then used to estimate total body fat.

Ultrasound
Ultrasound has also been used to measure subcutaneous fat thickness, and by using multiple points an estimation of body composition can be made.  Ultrasound has the advantage of being able to also directly measure muscle thickness and quantify intramuscular fat.

Quantitative magnetic resonance
Quantitative magnetic resonance (QMR) applies a magnetic field to the body and measures the difference in relaxation rates of hydrogen atoms within fat versus lean mass. It functions similarly to magnetic resonance imaging (MRI) but instead of providing an image like MRI, QMR gives quantities of fat mass, lean mass, and total body water. QMR is also widely used for body composition analysis of animals, including laboratory animals like mice, and wildlife including birds.

Circumferences and other measurements
Assessment of somatic (skeletal) protein is typically determined by simple measurements and calculations, including mid-arm circumference (MAC), mid-arm muscle circumference (MAMC), and creatinine height ratio (CHI). Creatinine height ratio is calculated as 24-hour urine creatinine multiplied by 100 over the expected 24-hour urine creatinine for height. This calculation results in a percentage that can indicate protein depletion.

Validity
The methods above are each valid and notable in providing a reasonably accurate range of the "true body composition" of the tested individual. However, each method does possess its own individual limitations, indeed precluding to the existence of so many variable methods available for an individual to use. Therefore, the actual method of testing body composition is not as important as the consistency of measurement in between each test. (See internal consistency for merits on testing in this manner.) If an individual is to be tested from one period to the next, all factors should ideally remain as similar as possible to reflect the best indicator of true change in composition.

Types of exercises 
The exercises needed to maintain optimal body composition differ from man to woman to child, but the ideal types of fitness remain the same.

The primary exercises needed to improve body composition involve fat burning and cardiovascular exercises.

See also
 Body fat percentage
 Body mass index
 Body volume index

References

External links
 

Physiology
Self-care
Body shape
Medical signs